Attica is a city in Harper County, Kansas, United States.  As of the 2020 census, the population of the city was 516.  The town was named after the historical region of Attica, in Greece.

History
Land for the community was purchased in late June 1884 and became the end of the Atchison, Topeka, and Santa Fe Railway.  The town was incorporated on February 16, 1885, with a population of 1,500 people.  The population grew further until the Cherokee Outlet in northern Oklahoma was opened by a Land run in 1893, at which point many people moved south to that territory.

Most of Attica is in Section 3 of Township 32 South of Range 9 West (S3-T32S-R9W) of the 6th Principal Meridian.  The land for Attica was purchased from the Osage Land Trust, which also held the surrounding farmland. According to documents from Attica, the Osage Land Trust was held by the US government for the Osage tribe.  Settlers could buy tracts of 160 acres (quarter-sections) for $1.25 / acre, and the money would go to the tribe.  For reference, some of that land sold in 1909 for $12/acre.

On May 12, 2004, the town was damaged by an F2 tornado that was received widespread coverage on local and national television.

Geography
Attica is located at  (37.242124, -98.227489).

Climate
The climate in this area is characterized by hot, humid summers and generally mild to cool winters.  According to the Köppen Climate Classification system, Attica has a humid subtropical climate, abbreviated "Cfa" on climate maps.

Demographics

2010 census
As of the census of 2010, there were 626 people, 246 households, and 155 families residing in the city. The racial makeup of the city was 95.7% White, 0.8% African American, 1.4% Native American, 1.3% from other races, and 0.8% from two or more races. Hispanic or Latino of any race were 4.2% of the population.

There were 246 households, of which 27.6% had children under the age of 18 living with them, 49.2% were married couples living together, 7.3% had a female householder with no husband present, 6.5% had a male householder with no wife present, and 37.0% were non-families. 32.9% of all households were made up of individuals, and 18.7% had someone living alone who was 65 years of age or older. The average household size was 2.36 and the average family size was 2.98.

The median age in the city was 42 years. 24.6% of residents were under the age of 18; 7.4% were between the ages of 18 and 24; 20.1% were from 25 to 44; 22.7% were from 45 to 64; and 25.2% were 65 years of age or older. The gender makeup of the city was 48.1% male and 51.9% female.

2000 census
As of the census of 2000, there were 636 people, 254 households, and 154 families residing in the city. The racial makeup of the city was 98.58% White, 0.94% Native American, 0.16% Asian, 0.16% Pacific Islander, and 0.16% from two or more races. Hispanic or Latino of any race were 0.63% of the population.

There were 254 households, out of which 23.2% had children under the age of 18 living with them, 50.8% were married couples living together, 6.3% had a female householder with no husband present, and 39.0% were non-families. 37.0% of all households were made up of individuals, and 19.3% had someone living alone who was 65 years of age or older. The average household size was 2.15 and the average family size was 2.82.

In the city, the population was spread out, with 19.7% under the age of 18, 6.9% from 18 to 24, 19.8% from 25 to 44, 21.9% from 45 to 64, and 31.8% who were 65 years of age or older. The median age was 48 years. For every 100 females, there were 83.8 males. For every 100 females age 18 and over, there were 78.0 males.

The median income for a household in the city was $31,012, and the median income for a family was $34,643. Males had a median income of $30,833 versus $20,000 for females. The per capita income for the city was $14,733. About 5.8% of families and 9.1% of the population were below the poverty line, including 10.4% of those under age 18 and 9.7% of those age 65 or over.

Education
The community is served by Attica USD 511 public school district.  The Attica High School mascot is Bulldogs.

References

Further reading

External list

 City of Attica
 Attica - Directory of Public Officials
 Attica city map, KDOT

Cities in Kansas
Cities in Harper County, Kansas
1884 establishments in Kansas
Populated places established in 1884